The 1969 Louisville Cardinals football team was an American football team that represented the University of Louisville in the Missouri Valley Conference (MVC) during the 1969 NCAA University Division football season. In their first season under head coach Lee Corso, the Cardinals compiled an 5–4–1 record (2–3 against conference opponents) and were outscored by a total of 273 to 206.

The team's statistical leaders included Gary Inman with 843 passing yards, Lee Bouggess with 1,064 rushing yards and 36 points scored, and Cookie Brinkman with 357 receiving yards.

Schedule

Roster

References

Louisville
Louisville Cardinals football seasons
Louisville Cardinals football